Sreelatha Namboothiri (born Anjilivelil Vasantha) is an Indian actress and playback singer who works in Malayalam cinema and television. She has acted in more than 300 films. Khadeeja in 1967 was her debut movie. The following is a complete list of her films as an actress and playback singer:

As an actress

As a playback singer
 "Kakkakkarumbikale"... Ezhu Raathrikal (1968)
 "Hari Krishna Krishna"... Vazhi Pizhacha Santhathi (1968)
 "Pankajadalanayane"... Vazhi Pizhacha Santhathi (1968)
 "Ithuvare Pennoru"...	Kaliyalla Kalyaanam (1968)
 "Midumidukkan Meeshkkomban"... Kaliyalla Kalyaanam (1968)
 "Kaalamenna Kaaranavarkku"... Kallichellamma (1969)
 "Kanne Karale"... Aashaachakram (1973)
 "Udalathiramyam"... Divyadarshanam (1973)
 "Velutha Vavinum"... Chakravaakam (1974)
 "Kaathilla Poothilla"... Arakkallan Mukkaalkkallan (1974)
 "Pachamalakkiliye"...	Thacholi Marumakan Chanthu (1974)
 "Onnaaman Kochuthumbi"... Thacholi Marumakan Chanthu (1974)
 "Sreemahaaganapathi"... Night Duty (1974)
 "Innu Ninte Youvanathinezhazhaku"... Night Duty (1974)
 "Thankabhasmakkuri" (Parody) ... Rahasyaraathri (1974)
 "Malayalam Beauty"... Padmaraagam (1975)
 "Bahar Se Koy"... Hello Darling (1975)
 "Angaadi Marunnukal"... Amrithavaahini (1976)
 "Kothikkothi"... Pushpasharam (1976)
 "Yadukula Maadhava"... Sindooram (1976)
 "Ariyaamo Ningalkkariyaamo"... Priyamvada (1976)
 "Kale Ninne Kandappol"... Mohavum Mukthiyum (1977)
 "Chora Thilaykkum Kaalam"... Raghuvamsham (1978)
 "Aavo Mera" ... Sathrusamhaaram (1978)
 "Maasapadikkare"... Ithikkarappakki (1980)
 "Punnarapponnumon"... Ithikkarappakki (1980)
 "Thinkalkkala Thirumudiyil Choodum"... Ithikkarappakki (1980)
 "Thaamarappoovanathile"... Ithikkarappakki (1980)

Dramas
Koottukudumbam
Yudhakandam

Television serials

TV shows
As Host
 Devageetham (Asianet) - Singer
 Sangeethika

 Reality show as Judge
 Comedy Circus (Mazhavil Manorama)
Comedy Stars (Asianet)
 Idea Star Singer (Asianet)

As Guest
Charithram Enniloode - Presenter
Straight Line
 Onnum Onnum Moonnu
 Oru Chiri Iruchiri Bumper Chiri
 Annie's Kitchen
 Onaruchikaliloode Sreelatha Namboothiri
 Comedy Super Nite
 Ivide Ingannanu Bhai
 Varthaprabhatham
 Humorous Talk Show
 Badai Bungalow
 Katha Ithuvare
 Tharapakittu
 Ennishtam
 Ormayilennum
 Thiranottam
 Jeevitham Ithuvare
 Nere Chovve
 My Favourites
 Nammal Thammil
 Red Carpet - Mentor
 Parayam Nedam - Participant
 Panam Tharum Padam - Participant
 Flowers Oru Kodi - Participant

References

Actress filmographies
Indian filmographies